The 1986 Gay Games (Gay Games II) were held in San Francisco, California, United States from August 9 to August 17, 1986.

The opening ceremony had Rita Mae Brown as master of ceremonies, and also featured Gwen Avery, the Barbary Coast Cloggers, Leona Jiles, Nepata Mero, Ron Murphy and his Choir, Sharon McNight, Calvin Remsberg (from the cast of Cats), the Golden Gate Precision Dancers, and the Lesbian/Gay Band of America. The closing ceremony was emceed by Armistead Maupin and featured Jennifer Holliday as the main star.

Events

References 

1986
1986 in multi-sport events
Gay Games
October 1986 sports events in the United States
1986 in San Francisco